The Natal Government Railways Class N 4-6-2T of 1906 was a South African steam locomotive from the pre-Union era in the Natal Colony.

In April 1906, the Natal Government Railways placed its first two 4-6-2T narrow-gauge tank steam locomotives in service. In 1912, when these locomotives were assimilated into the South African Railways, they retained their engine numbers, but with an "NG" prefix added. They were sold to the Moçâmedes Railway in Portuguese West Africa in 1915.

Natal's narrow gauge
By 1906, the Natal Government had realised that light railways were essential as feeders to open up fertile districts which were distant from the existing main- and branch lines, particularly when the intervening stretches of country were difficult from an engineering point of view. The construction of the first narrow-gauge railway line in Natal was therefore approved.

The maximum gradient on this line was 1 in 33 (3⅓%) compensated, with a minimum curvature of  radius. It was laid with  rail.

Manufacturer
The Class N 4-6-2T tank locomotive was designed by D.A. Hendrie, Locomotive Superintendent of the Natal Government Railways (NGR) from 1902 to 1910. It was the first narrow-gauge locomotive of the NGR.

An order for the construction of two of these locomotives was placed with Hunslet Engine Company in 1906. They were delivered in April 1906, numbered 1 and 2, and were placed in construction service on the new narrow-gauge line to Weenen.

Characteristics

Commonly known as the Hunslet Side Tanks, the locomotives had outside plate frames and used Walschaerts valve gear. To obtain a liberal firebox depth, the frames were opened out for some length at the rear end, with each frame constructed in two pieces which were connected by a cross stretcher in front of the firebox throat plate.

The cylinders were arranged horizontally outside the plate frames, while the flat "D" type slide valves were arranged above the cylinders and actuated by Walschaerts valve gear.

Service

Natal Government Railways
The Weenen narrow-gauge line was opened to regular passenger and goods traffic on 18 April 1907. As a result of tick fever restrictions upon the movement of ox wagon transport, a limited goods traffic service was already inaugurated on 4 October 1906 while the line was still under construction. By the end of 1906, the limited service had been extended all the way to Weenen.

When a locomotive classification system was introduced on the NGR by 1908, all narrow-gauge locomotives were designated Class N.

South African Railways
When the Union of South Africa was established on 31 May 1910, the three Colonial government railways (Cape Government Railways, NGR and Central South African Railways) were united under a single administration to control and administer the railways, ports and harbours of the Union. Although the South African Railways and Harbours came into existence in 1910, the actual classification and renumbering of all the rolling stock of the three constituent railways were only implemented with effect from 1 January 1912.

The two locomotives were not renumbered by the South African Railways (SAR) in 1912, but had the letters NG, for narrow gauge, prefixed to their existing numbers. They remained unclassified on the SAR, since a classification system for narrow-gauge locomotives was only adopted in the late 1920s after they had been withdrawn from service.

Moçâmedes Railway
In 1915, both locomotives were sold to the Moçâmedes Railway in Portuguese West Africa.

References

0760
0760
4-6-2 locomotives
2′C1′ n2t locomotives
Hunslet locomotives
2 ft gauge locomotives
Railway locomotives introduced in 1906
1906 in South Africa
Scrapped locomotives